The Burning Heart or Heart Aflame is a 1929 German silent drama film directed by Ludwig Berger and starring Mady Christians, Gustav Fröhlich, and Friedrich Kayßler. It was shot at the Staaken Studios in Berlin. The film's sets were designed by the art director Rudolf Bamberger.

Cast

References

Bibliography

External links

1929 films
Films of the Weimar Republic
1929 drama films
German silent feature films
German drama films
Films directed by Ludwig Berger
Terra Film films
German black-and-white films
Silent drama films
1920s German films